Saza e Ishq is a 2020 Pakistani romantic drama television series premiered on Express Entertainment on 7 January 2020. It is produced by Hammad Abass & Mukhtar Ahmad Chohan and directed by Fahim Burney. It has Azfar Rehman, Anmol Baloch and Humayoun Ashraf in lead roles.

Plot 
The story revolves around an orphan girl named Rameen (Anmol Baloch). Her parents died in her childhood and she became the sole owner of her father's wealth and property. She likes her cousin Saim (Humayun Ashraf) but her aunt (Saim's mother),  whom she is currently living with, fixed her marriage with Faris (Azfar Rehman) who belongs to rich background. The motive behind this was that she doesn’t want people to think that she fixed marriage of her son with Rameen due to her wealth and properties. Saim was shocked on her mother's decision while Rameen agrees on her aunt's decision as her aunt was the only one who took care of her after her parents' death. Soon after Rameen's marriage, her husband had an accident due to which he went in coma. Rameen is now taking care of her husband but she soon realizes that Faris will never recover from his coma. Considering Faris died, Rameen leave the house of her aunt and one day her family know that is died and after one year. Rameen is alive and than one day Alizeh (Saim's friend) see Rameen and Alizeh take Saim to Rameen's home. Saim shocked and than in last episode Saim marry Alizeh. Rameen is single completely.

Cast 

 Azfar Rehman as Faris
 Anmol Baloch as Rameen
 Humayoun Ashraf as Saim
 Shaheen Khan as Faiza
 Khalid Butt as Salman
 Subhan Awan as Fahad
 Tauqeer Ahmed as Sameer
 Kamran Jeelani
 Sarah Aijaz
 Noshaba Javed as Saim's mother
 Humaira Zahid

Soundtrack 

The title song is sung by Rahat Fateh Ali Khan. The music is composed by Sohail Haider and the lyrics written by Khalil-ur-Rehman Qamar.

References 

2020 Pakistani television series debuts
Pakistani drama television series
Pakistani television series
Urdu-language television shows